Giuseppe Giarrizzo (8 November 1927 - 28 November 2015) was an Italian historian and academic. He was professor emeritus at the University of Catania.

Life and career
Born in Riposto, the son of a sea captain, Giarrizzo studied letters under Santo Mazzarino at the University of Catania, graduating in 1949. In 1950 he won a fellowship at the Benedetto Croce's Italian Institute for Historical Studies, where under the guidance of  Federico Chabod he authored his first essay, Edward Gibbon: His View of Life and Conception of History. Between 1951 and 1954 he collaborated with Enciclopedia Italiana, writing entries related to the history of Christianity and to the English history. He then left this commitment as a Rockefeller Foundation fellowship led him to do academic trips in England, France and Holland. 

After having served as a lecturer for several years, in 1964 he became ordinary professor of modern history at his alma mater, and between 1968 and 1999 he also served as dean of the faculty. A member of the Accademia dei Lincei from 1994, he was founder and editor of the journal L’altra Sicilia and editor of the magazine Rivista storica italiana, as well as collaborator of several publications. Among other things, he was author of books about David Hume, Giambattista Vico and the history of Sicily.  A longtime associate of the Italian Socialist Party, between 1985 and 1986 he was town planning councillor of Catania.

References

External links 
 Giuseppe Giarrizzo at Open Library

 

1927 births
2015 deaths
People from Riposto
Italian historians
20th-century Italian writers
20th-century Italian essayists
University of Catania alumni
Academic staff of the University of Catania